Paul the Persian or Paulus Persa was a 6th-century East Syriac theologian and philosopher who worked at the court of the Sassanid king Khosrau I. He wrote several treatises and commentaries on Aristotle, which had some influence on medieval Islamic philosophy. He is identified by some scholars with Paulus of Nisibis (d. 571 AD) and with Paul of Basra. According to Jackson, he was "a Christian who may have studied Greek philosophy in the schools of Nisibis and Gundeshapur". He is remembered for his writings in Syriac for his royal patron. These include his notes in Syriac on Aristotle's Logic, in which he declares the superiority of science over faith.

Life 
Paul the Persian is known from the 9th-century The Chronicle of Seert and from the Chronicon Ecclesiasticum of the 13th-century Jacobite historian Bar-Hebraeus. These sources indicate that he was born in Dershahr in Persia. Bar-Hebraeus mentions that he lived during the time of the Nestorian patriarch Ezekiel (567-580). According to Bar-Hebraeus, Paul was a cleric in the Church of the East and well versed in ecclesiastical and philosophical matters.

Paul wrote two known works. He produced an introduction to the philosophy of Aristotle, which was delivered before the Persian King Chosroes I, and later translated into Syriac by Severus Sebokht.  The same work was also translated into Arabic at a later date. The other work extant is On Interpretation, which has never been published.

Both the Chronicle of Seert and Bar-Hebraeus record that he aspired to become metropolitan of Fars, and, failing to be elected, converted to Zoroastrianism.  However this is not otherwise documented and may merely be the product of the rivalry between the Jacobite Syriac Orthodox Church and the Nestorian Church of the East. The entry in the Chronicle of Seert reads:

Works 
 Prolegomena to Philosophy and Logic
 Treatise on the Logic of Aristotle the Philosopher addressed to King Khhuosrowousrowau (in Syriac; British Museum ms. 988 [Add. 144660], ff. 55v-67rv; Wright 1872, 1872, p. 1161); translated into Latin by J. P. N. Land

See also 
List of Iranian scientists and scholars

References

External links 
Paul the Persian (Encyclopedia Iranica)
The Syriac Institute
Paul the Persian (Raham Asha)
Aristotle’s Logic, Paul the Persian (Translated into Persian by Bozorgmehr Loghman)

Year of birth missing
Year of death missing
6th-century philosophers
Iranian philosophers
6th-century Iranian people
Converts to Zoroastrianism from Christianity
Khosrow I
Commentators on Aristotle
Iranian logicians
Christians in the Sasanian Empire
Persian philosophy
Ancient Iranian philosophers
Philosophy in Iran